EWWL Trocal League for season 2005–06 was the fifth season of WABA League. The study included ten teams from five countries, a champion for the second time in team history became Šibenik Jolly.  In this season participating clubs from Serbia and Montenegro, Bosnia and Herzegovina, Croatia,  Slovenia and Macedonia.

Team information

Regular season
The League of the season was played with 10 teams and play a dual circuit system, each with each one game at home and away. The four best teams at the end of the regular season were placed in the Final Four.

Final four
Final Four to be played 24 and 25 February 2006 in the SPC Vojvodina in Novi Sad, Serbia and Montenegro.

Awards
Player of the Year (MVP): Sandra Popović of Šibenik Jolly 
Top scorer: Ana Dabović of Herceg Novi 

1st Team
Sandra Popović (177-G-77) of Šibenik Jolly 
Katarina Maloča (190-F/C-75) of Gospić Croatia Osiguranje 
Ivana Dojčinović (189-F/C-81) of Vojvodina NIS 
Tihana Abrlić (194-C-76) of Šibenik Jolly 
Livia Libicova (193-C-77) of Merkur Celje

External links
  2005–06 EWWL Trocal league at eurobasket.com

2005-06
2005–06 in European women's basketball leagues
2005–06 in Serbian basketball
2005–06 in Bosnia and Herzegovina basketball
2005–06 in Slovenian basketball
2005–06 in Republic of Macedonia basketball
2005–06 in Croatian basketball